The 2020 Liberal Democratic Party of Japan leadership election was held on 14 September 2020 to elect the next president of the Liberal Democratic Party of Japan, three days before the National Diet was scheduled to hold a session to elect the new Prime Minister. Initially scheduled to be held in September 2021, incumbent party president and the longest-serving Prime Minister of Japan, Shinzo Abe, suddenly resigned on 28 August 2020, citing recent health concerns, prompting an election to select the President to serve the rest of Abe's term.

Chief Cabinet Secretary Yoshihide Suga easily won the election, securing endorsements from a majority of voting members of the party in the days preceding the vote. As the Liberal Democratic Party currently controls a majority in the National Diet as a member of the governing coalition, Suga successfully succeeded Abe as Japan's prime minister on 16 September 2020. His principal rival, Fumio Kishida, later succeeded him as prime minister after Suga's resignation in October 2021.

Background
Following several hospital visits which launched speculation into his health, incumbent Prime Minister Shinzo Abe announced during a press conference on 28 August 2020 that he would resign before the end of his final term in office due to a resurgence of his chronic ulcerative colitis. During the press conference, Abe announced that as a result the LDP is preparing for a leadership election to choose his successor, and that he would not endorse any specific candidate.

Procedure
There are two ways by which the president could be elected in the leadership election: the first would be an open election in which voting power is given to both party members and members of the National Diet. Each would receive half of the voting power to elect the new president. The other method would allow the vote to be restricted to the Diet members (394) and representatives from each of Japan’s 47 prefectures (141), which would add up to 535 electors. According to an LDP lawmaker, Toshihiro Nikai, the party's secretary-general, decided on the second option. To appear on the ballot, candidates must receive at least 20 nominations from the 394 Diet members in the LDP caucus.

Timeline

2020
 28 August – Shinzo Abe announces his resignation as Prime Minister and party president. He will remain on until a successor is chosen.
 29 August – Party officials announce the election will take place someday before, on, or after 15 September 2020.
 31 August – Party officials announce the election will be held on 14 September 2020.
 1 September – Former Foreign Affairs Minister Fumio Kishida and former Defense Minister Shigeru Ishiba officially announce their candidacies.
 2 September – Chief Cabinet Secretary Yoshihide Suga officially announces his candidacy.
 8 September – Campaign officially began. The candidates held a joint press conference.
 9 September – The first of two public debate between the leadership candidates was held.
 12 September – The second public debate between the leadership candidates was held.
 14 September – The election was held; Yoshihide Suga wins on the first ballot with 377 votes.

Candidates

Declared

Declined
Tarō Asō, Deputy Prime Minister, Minister of Finance, member of the House of Representatives for Fukuoka 8th district; former Prime Minister (2008–2009) and former party president (2008–2009). Grandson of former Prime Minister Shigeru Yoshida and brother of Princess Tomohito of Mikasa.
Tomomi Inada, member of the House of Representatives for Fukui 1st district; former Minister of Defense (2016-2017), Minister of Administrative Reform (2012-2014), Minister of State for Regulatory Reform (2012-2014).
Shinjiro Koizumi, Minister of the Environment, member of the House of Representatives for Kanagawa 11th district. Son of former Prime Minister Junichiro Koizumi.
Tarō Kōno, runner-up in the 2009 leadership election; Minister of Defense, member of the House of Representatives for Kanagawa 15th district; former Minister of Foreign Affairs (2017–2019) and former Chair of the National Public Safety Commission (2015–2016). Son of Yōhei Kōno, a former Speaker of the House of Representatives.
Toshimitsu Motegi, Minister of Foreign Affairs, member of the House of Representatives for Tochigi 5th district; former Minister of Economy, Trade and Industry (2012–2014).
Yasutoshi Nishimura, third place candidate in the 2009 leadership election; Minister of State for Economic and Fiscal Policy, member of the House of Representatives for Hyogo 9th district.
Seiko Noda, member of the House of Representatives for Gifu 1st district; former Minister for Internal Affairs and Communications (2017–2018). Wife of Yōsuke Tsuruho, member of the House of Councillors for Wakayama Prefecture.
Hakubun Shimomura, current party election strategy chief, member of the House of Representatives for Tokyo 11th district; former Minister of Education, Culture, Sports, Science and Technology (2012–2015).

Endorsements

Opinion polling

Nationwide

Results 

44 prefectural LDP branches held primaries, while the prefectural federations in Hokkaidō and Niigata conducted questionnaire-style surveys among their members and the LDP Akita didn't hold any form of membership vote. 

Of the 46 primaries or surveys, Kishida only carried his home prefecture of Hiroshima, winning all three delegates, and Yamanashi where he won two delegates over one for Suga. 

Ishiba won all three delegates in his home prefecture of Tottori, and carried Toyama, Mie, Shimane, Kōchi and Miyazaki by two delegates to one over Suga. Yamagata, Fukushima, Kagawa, Nagasaki and Kumamoto split their delegates evenly between the three candidates.

In all other prefectures, Suga prevailed, winning either all three prefectural delegates, or two with the third going to Ishiba, depending on the vote margin of his victory and on whether the primary voting system was d'Hondt proportional, as it was in the majority of prefectures, or FPTP.

References

Liberal
Indirect elections
Political party leadership elections in Japan
Liberal Democratic Party (Japan)
Liberal
Liberal Democratic Party (Japan) leadership election